Camouflage is the concealment of animals or objects of military interest by any combination of methods that helps them to remain unnoticed. This includes the use of high-contrast disruptive patterns as used on military uniforms, but anything that delays recognition can be used as camouflage. Camouflage involves deception, whether by looking like the background or by resembling something else, which may be plainly visible to observers. This article lists methods used by animals and the military to escape notice.

Conventions used

Different camouflage methods employed by terrestrial, aerial, and aquatic animals, and in military usage, are compared in the table. Several methods are often combined, so for example the Bushbuck is both countershaded over its whole body, and disruptively coloured with small pale spots. Until the discovery of countershading in the 1890s, protective coloration was considered to be mainly a matter of colour matching, but while this is certainly important, a variety of other methods are used to provide effective camouflage.

When an entry is marked Dominant, that method is used widely in that environment, in most cases. For example, countershading is very common among land animals, but not for military camouflage. The dominant camouflage methods on land are countershading and disruptive coloration, supported by less frequent usage of many other methods. The dominant camouflage methods in the open ocean are transparency, reflection, and counterillumination. Most animals of the open sea use one or more of these methods. Military camouflage relies predominantly on disruptive patterns, though methods such as outline disruption are also used, and others have been prototyped.

In 1890 the English zoologist Edward Bagnall Poulton categorised animal colours by their uses, which cover both camouflage and mimicry. Poulton's categories were largely followed by Hugh Cott in 1940. Relevant Poulton categories are listed in the table. Where Poulton's definition covers a method but does not name it explicitly, the category is named in parentheses.

Comparisons

References

Bibliography

 Barkas, Geoffrey; Barkas, Natalie (1952). The Camouflage Story (from Aintree to Alamein). Cassell.
 Beddard, Frank Evers (1892). Animal Coloration: an account of the principal facts and theories relating to the colours and markings of animals. Swan Sonnenschein.
 Cott, Hugh (1940). Adaptive Coloration in Animals. Oxford University Press.
 Forbes, Peter (2009). Dazzled and Deceived: Mimicry and Camouflage. Yale. .
 Herring, Peter (2002). The Biology of the Deep Ocean. Oxford University Press. .
 Newark, Tim (2007). Camouflage. Thames and Hudson. .
 Poulton, Edward Bagnall (1890). The Colours of Animals: their meaning and use especially considered in the case of insects. Kegan Paul, Trench, Trübner.
 Stevens, Martin; Merilaita, Sami (2011). Animal Camouflage. Cambridge University Press. .
 Wickler, Wolfgang (1968). Mimicry in plants and animals. McGraw-Hill. 

Methods
Biology-related lists
Military lists